The women's javelin throw at the 2017 World Para Athletics Championships was held at the Olympic Stadium in London from 14 to 23 July.

Medalists

Events listed in pink were contested but no medals were awarded.

Detailed results

F11

F13

F34

F37

F46

F54

F56

See also
List of IPC world records in athletics

References

Javelin throw
2017 in women's athletics
Javelin throw at the World Para Athletics Championships
Women's sport in London